The Hampton Grand Prix is a defunct USLTA / Grand Prix affiliated men's tennis tournament played from 1970 to 1977. It was held in Hampton, Virginia in the United States and played on indoor hard courts.

Jimmy Connors and Ilie Năstase were the most successful players at the tournament, with Connors winning the singles competition four times while Năstase won the singles title once and the doubles title three times, twice with compatriot Ion Ţiriac and once with American Clark Graebner.

Past finals

Singles

Doubles

External links
 ATP results archive

Defunct tennis tournaments in the United States
Hard court tennis tournaments
Indoor tennis tournaments
Grand Prix tennis circuit
Recurring sporting events established in 1971
Recurring sporting events disestablished in 1977
1971 establishments in Virginia
1977 disestablishments in Virginia
Sports in Hampton Roads